Mordellistena elongata is a beetle in the genus Mordellistena of the family Mordellidae. It was described in 1863 by Fairmaire & Germain.

References

elongata
Beetles described in 1863